Anna is 1994 Indian Telugu-language action film directed by Muthyala Subbaiah and produced by Pokuri Babu Rao. The film stars Rajasekhar, Gautami, Roja and Master Baladitya. The music was composed by M. M. Keeravani. The film was remade in Hindi as Bhai in 1997, in Kannada as Nammanna in 2005 and in Bengali as Ghatak in 2006. The film premiered at the 1995 IIFA Film Festival. The film won four Nandi Awards & one Filmfare Award.

Cast
Rajasekhar as Komaranna
Gautami as Sarada
Roja as Chandi
Master Baladitya as Chinna
Brahmanandam
Sirisha Jasti 
M. Balaiah
Pradeep Shakthi as Police Inspector
Narra Venkateswara Rao
Gollapudi Maruthi Rao
Suthivelu
Devaraj

Soundtrack

The music was composed by M. M. Keeravani., and released by the Akash Audio Company. It is now owned by Aananda Audio Video.

Awards
Filmfare Awards South
Filmfare Award for Best Actor – Telugu - Rajasekhar

Nandi Awards -1994 
Best Supporting Actor - Brahmanandam
Best Child Actor - Y. S. Adithya
Best Dialogue writer - M. V. S. Haranatha Rao
Best Supporting Actress - Roja

References

External links

1994 films
Indian action films
Films scored by M. M. Keeravani
Telugu films remade in other languages
1990s Telugu-language films
Films directed by Muthyala Subbaiah
1994 action films